Paint Creek is a  tributary of the Levisa Fork in Johnson County, Kentucky. The stream is formed at the confluence of the Little Paint and Open Fork creeks. It is named for the colorful Adena Indian ideographs that were painted on white birch trees and rocks that once lined the stream.

Paint Creek rises in extreme western Johnson County and begins to flow southeast. In 1983, part of Paint Creek was impounded, forming Paintsville Lake. After passing through the Paintsville Lake dam, the stream passes through the city of Paintsville, where it joins the Levisa Fork.

Paint Creek is the only designated trout stream in Johnson County. The water level of the creek is dependent upon rainfall, and can vary from very shallow to deep and rapid depending on recent weather conditions. Fishermen can expect to catch brown trout, rainbow trout, small mouth bass, bream, rock bass, crappie, catfish, white sucker and many other species as well as creek chubs, freshwater mussels and mud eels.

See also
List of rivers of Kentucky

References

External links
Paintsville Lake State Park

Rivers of Kentucky
Rivers of Johnson County, Kentucky